Rangsan Wiroonsri (born February 12, 1992) is a Thai professional footballer who plays as a defensive midfielder for Thai League 1 club Police Tero.

External links

1992 births
Living people
Rangsan Wiroonsri
Rangsan Wiroonsri
Association football midfielders
Rangsan Wiroonsri
Rangsan Wiroonsri
Rangsan Wiroonsri